Muhammad Ali Sadpara (– ) was a Pakistani high-altitude mountaineer. He was part of the team (which included Italian alpinist Simone Moro and Basque alpinist Alex Txikon) that successfully completed the first winter ascent to the summit of Nanga Parbat in 2016. Throughout his career, Sadpara successfully climbed a total of eight eight-thousanders, four of which he had ascended in a single calendar year.

Sadpara, along with his 21-year-old son Sajid (who had also climbed K2 in 2019), teamed up with Icelandic mountaineer John Snorri Sigurjónsson and Chilean mountaineer Juan Pablo Mohr Prieto for a joint ascent of K2, and left the highest camp on the evening of 4 February 2021. Sajid was later forced to descend due to an oxygen regulator malfunction, leaving the other members of the team at the K2 Bottleneck, close to the summit. Sadpara, Sigurjónsson, and Prieto continued their ascent to K2's summit, but did not return by night as planned, and were declared missing on 5 February 2021. A rescue mission with two Pakistan Army helicopters was organized on 6 February 2021 to search for the team.

On 18 February 2021, Pakistani authorities announced that the three men were officially presumed dead, but the search for their remains would continue; Sadpara's family also declared him as presumably dead on the same day. On 26 July 2021, three bodies believed to be of the missing mountaineers were found on the slopes above Camp 4. The bodies were found by a Madison Mountaineering Sherpa Team that was fixing ropes above the camp.

Early life 
Sadpara was born on 2 February 1976 in the village of Sadpara, located near Skardu in Gilgit−Baltistan, Pakistan. He was the youngest of eleven children, and eight of his siblings did not survive childhood. He married his wife, Fatima, when he was 19 and had his first son, Sajid, shortly afterwards; he had a total of three children. He completed his FA from a government college in Skardu and was a member of his college football team. He began his career as a high-altitude porter, serving as an assistant in mountain-climbing expeditions. Like most other porters, Sadpara traversed the rugged Baltoro Glacier in flip-flops and castoff gear.

Mountaineering experience 

Sadpara had successfully climbed eight of the 14 eight-thousanders on Earth. His first climb was Gasherbrum II, located in the Karakoram range.

In 2015, Sadpara's team attempted to scale Nanga Parbat during wintertime and were unsuccessful; the team attempted another winter ascent in 2016 and successfully summited its peak, resulting in the first-ever winter ascent of the mountain. Sadpara had successfully ascended Nanga Parbat four times in his mountaineering career.

In June 2018, he was enlisted by French speed climber  to undertake a five-year program known as "Beyond Mount Everest". They planned to summit Nanga Parbat, K2 and Mount Everest in 2019, 2021, and 2022, respectively.

Tributes
Ali Sadpara Climbing Wall at Qayyum Stadium, Peshawar.
U.S. based NGO Paani Project built a well in honor of Sadpara.
Pakistan International Airlines inaugurated air safari in name of Ali Sadpara.
A park in Karachi was made in honour of Sadpara.

See also
List of solved missing person cases
List of unsolved deaths

References 

1976 births
2020s missing person cases
2021 deaths
Balti people
Formerly missing people
Missing person cases in Pakistan
Mountaineering deaths on K2
Pakistani summiters of K2
Pakistani mountain climbers
People from Gilgit-Baltistan
People from Skardu District
Unsolved deaths